Sharad Ranpise (18 September 1951 – 23 September 2021) was an Indian politician who was a member of the Indian National Congress. On 10 July 2018, he was re-elected unopposed with 10 others to the Maharashtra Legislative Council.

References

1951 births
2021 deaths
Indian National Congress politicians from Maharashtra
Members of the Maharashtra Legislative Council